"Simon Smith and the Amazing Dancing Bear" is a song written by Randy Newman, about a young man of modest means who entertains affluent diners with his dancing bear. A recording by the Alan Price Set reached number four on the UK Singles Chart in April 1967. The success bought Newman to public attention as a songwriter; he recorded the song himself for his 1972 album Sail Away.

Background and composition
Randy Newman wrote the ragtime-influenced song in 1964. He considered it a major stepping point in his songwriting, telling Performing Songwriter "I was writing a song, believe it or not, for Frank Sinatra Jr. And it was called something like "Susie" or "Mary" and I just all of a sudden couldn’t do it. So I ended up somewhere with "coat to wear" and "dancing bear"... ...and then I was never the same. And I never wrote particularly conventional songs after that." Sinatra Jr. never recorded the finished song.

The song concerns Simon Smith, a young man of modest means who entertains affluent ("well-fed") diners with his dancing bear. Biographer Kevin Courrier has described the song as "the first hint of Newman the outsider looking to entertain the world". Newman has alluded to the bear as a gentile who serves to allow Smith, an outsider, to assimilate.

Recordings and legacy
Newman first offered Simon Smith and the Amazing Dancing Bear to Californian sunshine pop band Harpers Bizarre. Their recording appears on their first album Feelin' Groovy, issued in April 1967. The song was popularised by a recording by the Alan Price Set. Price considered Newman "head and shoulders above anyone else" as a songwriter. His version of the song was issued as a single by Decca Records on 24 February 1967, backed with another Newman composition, "Tickle Me". The single reached number four on the Record Retailer chart in April 1967. Price filmed a promotional clip for the song with two bears from Colchester Zoo. The success earned Newman a record contract with Warner Bros. Records.

Upon its release, Peter Jones of Record Mirror described Price as "high on my short list of Most Distinctive Voices" and characterised the song as "jazz-styled and bouncy and smokey and with tremendous punchy piano". Don Short of Daily Mirror doubted the song's hit potential, writing "the song is not so weird as the title, but I can't see the Alan Price Set making the charts with it".. Reviewing the week's new singles for Melody Maker, Paul McCartney praised the song and considered it a likely hit, describing it as "so much better than the period, vaudeville stuff because it's still a bit modern".

Newman's own recording of Simon Smith and the Amazing Dancing Bear features on his 1972 album Sail Away. It has been covered by such artists as Harry Nilsson, Morrissey, Bobby Short, Akiko Yano, and Okkervil River. Bobbie Gentry recorded a gender-switched version, "Salome Smith and Her Amazing Dancing Bear". The song appears in the 19th episode of the first season of The Muppet Show, sung by the character Scooter as Simon Smith and with Fozzie Bear as the dancing bear.

In 1971, John Cleese chose the Alan Price Set version of the song when he appeared on Desert Island Discs. In 2023, the song ranked eighth in The Guardian's list of Randy Newman's 20 greatest songs.

References

Songs about bears
Songs about dancing
Songs about fictional male characters
1967 singles
Alan Price songs
Randy Newman songs
Songs written by Randy Newman
The Muppets songs
1967 songs
Song recordings produced by Russ Titelman
Song recordings produced by Lenny Waronker